The Reynoldsiellini are a tribe of beetles in the family Mordellidae.

Genera
Reynoldsiella Ray, 1930
Reynoldsiellina Franciscolo, 1957

References

Mordellidae